Henry James Hamilton Brookes (born 21 August 1999) is an English cricketer. He made his first-class debut for Warwickshire in the 2017 County Championship on 12 September 2017. He made his List A debut for Warwickshire in the 2018 Royal London One-Day Cup on 20 May 2018. He made his Twenty20 debut for Warwickshire in the 2018 t20 Blast on 4 July 2018. He got his first 5 wicket haul in The Hundred for Birmingham Phoenix against Southern Brave on 10 August 2022. 

On 29 May 2020, Brookes was named in a 55-man group of players to begin training ahead of international fixtures starting in England following the COVID-19 pandemic. On 9 July 2020, Brookes was included in England's 24-man squad to start training behind closed doors for the One Day International (ODI) series against Ireland.

In April 2022, he was bought by the Birmingham Phoenix for the 2022 season of The Hundred.

References

External links
 
 Henry Brookes at Warwickshire County Cricket Club

1999 births
Living people
English cricketers
Warwickshire cricketers
Sportspeople from Solihull
Birmingham Phoenix cricketers